The 2020 Munster Senior Hurling Championship Final was a hurling match that was played on 1 November at Semple Stadium in Thurles. It was contested by defending champions Limerick and Waterford.

Limerick captained by Declan Hannon retained the title after a 0-25 to 0-21 win. 

The same two teams went on to contest the 2020 All-Ireland Final on 13 December with Limerick again winning by 0-30 to 0-19.

References

Munster Final
Munster Championship
Munster Senior Hurling Championship Finals
Hurling in County Limerick